Elisabeth Sara Kehoe is an author and senior research fellow of the Institute of Historical Research, University of London. She obtained her PhD from the University of London in 2002 on the subject of "The British Museum: The cultural politics of a national institution".

Selected publications
 Fortune’s Daughters: the Extravagant Lives of the Jerome Sisters: Jennie Churchill, Clara Frewen and Leonie Leslie (London: Atlantic, 2004)
 Ireland’s Misfortune: the Turbulent Life of Kitty O’Shea (London: Atlantic, 2008)
 "Daughters of Ireland: Maud Gonne, Dr Kathleen Lynn and Dorothy MacArdle", in The Shaping of Modern Ireland: A Centenary Assessment, edited by Eugenio Biagini and Daniel Mulhall (Dublin: Irish Academic Press, 2016).
 Queen of the Savoy: The Extraordinary Life of Helen D’Oyly Carte 1852-1913  (London:Unicorn, 2022).

Media appearances
Lady Randy: Churchill's Mother, Channel 4, UK, 2008;
Secrets of the Manor House: 2 of the 4 series, PBS in the US and Virgin in the UK, 2012;
Secrets of Chatsworth PBS in US and Virgin in the UK, 2013;
Million Dollar American Princesses: "Cash for Class", Smithsonian in the US, and ITV in UK, 2015;
Million Dollar American Princesses: "Wedding of the Century", Smithsonian and ITV, 2015;
Million Dollar American Princesses: "Movers and Shakers", Smithsonian and ITV, 2015.

References

Academics of the Institute of Historical Research
INSEAD alumni
Alumni of the University of London
Writers from Heidelberg
Alumni of University College London
British women historians
British biographers
Year of birth missing (living people)
Living people
Women biographers